Big Science is the debut studio album by avant-garde artist Laurie Anderson. It was the first of a seven-album deal Anderson signed with Warner Bros. Records. It is best known for the single "O Superman", which unexpectedly reached No. 2 in the UK. The work is a selection of highlights from her eight-hour production United States Live, which was itself released as a 5-LP boxed set and book in 1984. United States Live was originally a performance piece, in which music was only one element. After Big Science, music played a larger role in Anderson's work.

Although considered her debut album, Anderson had previously recorded one side of a 2-LP set titled You're the Guy I Want to Share My Money With, a collaboration released on Giorno Poetry Systems with William S. Burroughs and John Giorno. She had also contributed two pieces to a 1977 compilation of electronic music.

Background
Track 8, without the tango or the horns, was released as a flexi disc in the February issue of Artforum earlier in 1982. A sleeve for the disc could be cut out from the magazine and assembled.

A newly remastered version of the album was released on 18 June 2007 by Nonesuch/Elektra Records with new liner notes, and, in the data portion of the CD, the bonus track "Walk the Dog" (B-side of the original "O Superman" single) and the "O Superman" video.

Slant Magazine listed the album at #44 on its list of "Best Albums of the 1980s." In 2018, Pitchfork listed the album at #22 on its list of the "200 Best Albums of the 1980s."

Laurie Anderson enjoyed a surprise popular hit in the United Kingdom with "O Superman" in 1981. Her subsequent albums Big Science and Mister Heartbreak each sold between 100,000 and 125,000 copies in the United States, and even the five-record United States - Live sold 40,000, according to Elliot Abbott, Anderson's manager and the executive producer of Home of the Brave.  As of 1983, the album had sold 150,000 copies worldwide.

Track listing
All words and music by Laurie Anderson
 "From the Air" – 4:29
 "Big Science" – 6:25
 "Sweaters" – 2:18
 "Walking & Falling" – 2:10
 "Born, Never Asked" – 4:56
 "O Superman (for Massenet)" – 8:21
 "Example #22" – 2:59
 "Let X=X/It Tango" – 6:52

"O Superman" mixed at The Lobby; for Massenet; originally released on One Ten Records
"Example #22" special thanks to Paranormals Medeline Vester, Gerhard Rozhek, Coretta Atteroc, Shelley Karson
"Let X=X" original version appeared in ArtForum February 1982

Personnel
Laurie Anderson – vocals, vocoder, Farfisa organ, percussion, Oberheim OB-Xa, sticks, violins, electronics, keyboards, handclaps, whistling, marimba, cover artwork
Roma Baran – Farfisa bass, glass harmonica, sticks, handclaps, Casiotone, accordion, whistling
Perry Hoberman – bottles and sticks, handclaps, flute, saxophone, piccolo, backing vocals, assistant producer, art direction
Bill Obrecht – alto saxophone
Peter Gordon – clarinet, tenor saxophone
David Van Tieghem – drums, rototoms, timpani, marimba, percussion
Additional personnel
Rufus Harley – bagpipes on 3
Chuck Fisher – alto and tenor saxophone on 7
Richard Cohen – b-flat clarinet on 7, e-flat clarinet on 7, bass clarinet on 7, bassoon on 7, baritone saxophone on 7
Leanne Ungar – engineer, backing vocals on 7
George E. Lewis – trombones

"Special thanks to Patty Anderson, Lester Bangs, Robert Coe, Anton Fier, Charles Holland, Geraldine Pontius, Greg Shifrin and Gail Turner".

Charts
Album

References

Laurie Anderson albums
1982 debut albums
Warner Records albums